Guillermo Enrique Rishchynski Oller (born December 26, 1953, in Toronto, Ontario) is a Canadian diplomat.

Early life and career 
Rishchynski was born to Canadian and Panamanian parents and lived for a time in Ohio before attending Elwood-John H. Glenn High School in East Northport, New York. He graduated from McGill University in Montréal, Québec, in 1975, and worked as a regional Latin America marketing manager for Interimco International before joining the Department of External Affairs and International Trade in 1983 as an assistant trade commissioner. He has served abroad in Rio de Janeiro, São Paulo, Amman, Melbourne, Jakarta, Chicago and, from 1999 to 2002, as Ambassador to Colombia, in Bogotá.

In Ottawa, he has served the department as deputy director, Latin America and Caribbean Trade Division, and director, Team Canada Task Force. He joined the Canadian International Development Agency in 2003, serving as vice-president of the Americas Branch until his appointment as Ambassador to Brazil in 2005. In 2007, he was appointed Ambassador to Mexico.

Rishchynski was appointed Canada's Ambassador and Permanent Representative of Canada to the United Nations on August 15, 2011. After leaving the United Nations in January 2016, Rishchynski served as Executive Director for Canada at the Inter-American Development Bank.

Rischynski is a member of the Inter-American Dialogue.

He is also a member of the band UNRocks, together with other diplomats.

References

External links
 Canadian Embassy in Brazil - Message from the Ambassador 
 

McGill University alumni
Living people
1953 births
Place of birth missing (living people)
Ambassadors of Canada to Brazil
Ambassadors of Canada to Mexico
Ambassadors of Canada to Colombia
Permanent Representatives of Canada to the United Nations
Canadian people of Panamanian descent
People from Toronto
People from East Northport, New York
Members of the Inter-American Dialogue